All Saints, Margaret Street, is a Grade I listed Anglo-Catholic church in London. The church was designed by the architect William Butterfield and built between 1850 and 1859. It has been hailed as Butterfield's masterpiece and a pioneering building of the High Victorian Gothic style that would characterize British architecture from around 1850 to 1870.

The church is situated on the north side of Margaret Street in Fitzrovia, near Oxford Street, within a small courtyard. Two other buildings face onto this courtyard: one is the vicarage and the other (formerly a choir school) now houses the parish room and flats for assistant priests.

All Saints is noted for its architecture, style of worship, and musical tradition.

History
All Saints had its origins in the Margaret Street Chapel which had stood on the site since the 1760s. The chapel had "proceeded upwards through the various gradations of Dissent and Low-Churchism" until 1829, when the Tractarian William Dodsworth became its incumbent. Dodsworth later converted to Roman Catholicism, as did one of his successors, Frederick Oakeley. Before his resignation from the post, Oakeley, who was later to describe the chapel as "a complete paragon of ugliness" had conceived the idea of rebuilding the chapel in what he considered a correct ecclesiastical style, and had collected a sum of almost £3,000 for the purpose. He was succeeded at the chapel by his assistant William Upton Richards.

In 1845, Alexander Beresford Hope realised that the chapel rebuilding scheme could be combined with the project of the Cambridge Camden Society to found a model church. His proposal met with the approval of Upton Richards, George Chandler, rector of All Souls, and Charles James Blomfield, the Bishop of London. It was decided that the architectural and ecclesiological aspects of the project would be put entirely under the control of the Cambridge Camden Society, who appointed Sir Stephen Glynne and Beresford Hope to oversee the work. In the event, Glynne was unable to take an active part, and Beresford Hope took sole charge.

William Butterfield was selected as the architect and the site in Margaret Street purchased for £14,500. The last service at the old chapel was held on Easter Monday, 1850, and the foundation stone of the new building was laid on All Saints' Day of that year by Edward Bouverie Pusey. Services were held in a temporary chapel in Titchfield Street for the next nine years, until the new church was finally consecrated on 28 May 1859. The total cost of the church, including the site and endowments was around £70,000; several large individual donations helped to fund it.

Architecture

All Saints marked a new stage in the development of the Gothic Revival in English architecture. The author and columnist Simon Jenkins called All Saints "architecturally England's most celebrated Victorian church", and the architectural historian Simon Thurley listed All Saints among the ten most important buildings in the country.

The design of the church showed Butterfield (in Sir John Betjeman's words) "going on from where the Middle Ages left off" as a neo-Gothic architect. Previous architecture of the 19th-century Gothic Revival had copied medieval buildings. But Butterfield departed considerably from medieval Gothic practice, especially by using new materials like brick. Charles Locke Eastlake, the 19th-century architect and writer, wrote that Butterfield's design was "a bold and magnificent endeavour to shake off the trammels of antiquarian precedent, which had long fettered the progress of the Revival, to create not a new style, but a development of previous styles". The Victorian critic John Ruskin wrote after seeing All Saints: "Having done this, we may do anything; ... and I believe it to be possible for us, not only to equal, but far to surpass, in some respects, any Gothic yet seen in Northern countries."

Butterfield's use of building materials was innovative. All Saints is built of brick, in contrast to Gothic Revival churches of the 1840s, typically built of grey Kentish ragstone. At All Saints, Butterfield felt a mission to "give dignity to brick", and the quality of the brick he chose made it more expensive than stone. The exterior of All Saints employs red brick, heavily banded and patterned with black brick, with bands of stone and carved elements in the gate, the church wall and spire. Decoration is therefore built into the structure, making All Saints the first example of 'structural polychromy' in London.

All Saints is particularly celebrated for its interior decoration. Every surface is richly patterned or decorated; the floor in diaper patterned tiles, wall surfaces in geometrical patterned brick, tile, and marble, as well as tiles with painted decoration, large friezes executed in painted tiles, a painted ceiling, and painted and gilded timberwork behind the altar. The architectural historian Nikolaus Pevsner described the interior as "dazzling, though in an eminently High Victorian ostentatiousness or obtrusiveness. ... No part of the walls is left undecorated. From everywhere the praise of the Lord is drummed into you."

The rear of the chancel features a series of paintings on gilded boards, within a delicately  carved brightly patterned gothic screen, the work of Ninian Comper and a restoration of earlier work by William Dyce. The decoration of the Lady Chapel is also by Comper. The north wall is dominated by a large ceramic tile frieze designed by Butterfield, painted by Alexander Gibbs, and fired by Henry Poole and Sons, installed in 1873. It depicts a variety of scenes from the Old Testament, a central Nativity scene and depictions of Early Church Fathers.

The stained-glass windows are limited in All Saints due to the density of buildings around the church. The original windows were designed by Alfred Gérente but his work was not held in high regard and was subsequently replaced. The large west window, which was originally fitted with glass by Gerente in 1853–58, was replaced in 1877 with a design by Alexander Gibbs based on the Tree of Jesse window in Wells Cathedral. The glass in the clerestory dates from 1853 and is the work of Michael O'Connor, who also designed the east window of the south chancel aisle which depicts Christ in Majesty with St Edward Martyr and St Augustine.

The baptistery in the south-west corner of the church is noted for its marble tiling which features an image of the Pelican in her Piety in the ceiling tiles, a symbol of the fall and redemption of man.
 The reredos, by Butterfield, was moved to St Catherine's Church, Wickford, at some time during the 20th century.

Anglo-Catholicism
The church's style of worship is Anglo-Catholic, "the Catholic faith as taught by the Church of England", offering members and visitors a traditional style of liturgy, as advocated by the Oxford Movement of the mid-nineteenth century, including ritual, choir and organ music, vestments and incense.

As a traditional Anglo-Catholic parish, All Saints passed a resolution under the House of Bishops' Declaration on 26 November 2016 (affirmed on 13 July 2020) to ask that episcopal and priestly sacramental ministry in the parish be exercised by male bishops at whose consecration a male bishop presided and who stand in the historic, apostolic succession of bishops so ordained, and by male priests ordained by such bishops. It receives alternative episcopal oversight from the Bishop of Fulham (currently Jonathan Baker).

Incumbents

1859–1873 William Upton Richards
1873–1886 Berdmore Compton
1886–1905 William Allen Whitworth
1905–1908 George Frederick Holden
1908–1934 Henry Falconar Barclay Mackay
1934–1942 Dom Bernard Clements OSB
1943–1951 Cyril Edric Tomkinson
1951–1969 Kenneth Needham Ross
1969–1975 Michael Eric Marshall
1976–1981 David Alan Sparrow
1982–1985 David Michael Hope
1986–1995 David Handley Hutt
1995–2019 Leslie Alan Moses
2021–present Peter Benedict Anthony

Services
Sunday
High Mass at 11.00 am
Morning Prayer at 10.20 am
Low Mass at 8.00 am and 5.15 pm
Solemn Evensong and Benediction at 6.00 pm
Monday to Friday
Morning Prayer at 7.30 am
Low Mass at 8.00 am, 1.10 pm and 6.30 pm
Confessions from 12.30 to 1.00 pm and 5.30 pm
Evening Prayer at 6.00 pm
Saturday
Morning Prayer at 7.30 am
Low Mass at 8.00 am and 6.30 pm (first Mass of Sunday)
Confessions at 5.30 pm
Evening Prayer at 6.00 pm
Weekday Solemnities (please see notices)
High Mass at 6.30pm

Music

A choir school was established at the church in 1843, which provided music for daily choral services. The choir was widely recognised for its excellence and choristers sang at the Coronations of Edward VII (1902), George V (1911), George VI (1937) and Elizabeth II (1953) as well as at Victoria's Jubilees (1887 and 1897). Amongst its alumni is Laurence Olivier. The school closed in 1968, at which point the boys' voices were replaced by adult sopranos. The survival of the choir school had been discussed many years earlier. Writing to parishioners in 1894, the vicar lamented that the changing demography of the area meant that there were now few children left in the parish, and that the number of wealthy patrons in the congregation had decreased as they moved further west.

The present-day choir maintains the exacting standards of its predecessors.

The repertoire for choir and organ stretches from before the Renaissance to the 21st century and includes several pieces commissioned for the church, most famously Walter Vale's arrangement of Rachmaninoff's Liturgy of St John Chrysostom and All-Night Vigil for Western-Rite Mass and Evensong respectively. Rachmaninoff heard Vale's adaptations during his two visits to the church, in 1915 and 1923, and pronounced his approval of them. They are still sung on Palm Sunday.

All Saints' organ is a superb four-manual Harrison and Harrison instrument with 65 speaking stops, built in 1910 to a specification drawn up by Walter Vale. It retains the best of the pipework of its predecessor, the original and considerably smaller Hill organ. Though as big as those found in most cathedrals, it is perfectly tailored to All Saints' smaller dimensions – powerful, but not excessively so, sounding intimate when played quietly, and monumental when loud. Harrison rebuilt it in 1957, replacing the tubular pneumatic action with electro-pneumatic. Electrical blowers replaced the hydraulic blowing plant.

The tonal changes made to 10 stops in 1957 – like those made to many other organs at that time – altered the tone of the instrument, to a very limited extent, to a more 'classical' sound. Therefore, when the organ next required major restoration work, the decision was taken to try to restore the sound nearer to that of 1910: to return it to an 'Edwardian Romantic' organ. The completed restoration was celebrated with two inauguration concerts in March 2003.

Organists have included Richard Redhead, the first organist and remembered today as the composer of Rock of Ages and Bright the Vision, Walter Vale (1907–1939), William Lloyd Webber (1939–1948), John Birch (1953–58), Michael Fleming (1958–68) and Harry Bramma (1989–2004), many of whom wrote music for use at All Saints and beyond.

Directors of Music (selected)
1839–1864 Richard Redhead
1860–1868 Christopher Edwin Willing
1868–1907 William Stevenson Hoyte
1907–1939 Walter S. Vale
1939–1948 William Lloyd Webber
1949–1951 John Williams
1952–1953 Garth Benson
1953–1958 John Birch
1958–1968 Michael Fleming
1968–1988 (James) Eric Arnold
1988–1989 Murray Stewart
1989–2004 Harry Bramma
2004–2013 Paul Brough
2013–2018 Timothy Byram-Wigfield
2020–present Stephen Farr

See also
 List of churches and cathedrals of London

References

Further reading
Almedingen, E. M. (1945) Dom Bernard Clements: a portrait. London: John Lane

External links

 
All Saints Margaret Street
Most recent Mystery Worshipper Report at the Ship of Fools website

Churches completed in 1859
19th-century Church of England church buildings
Church of England church buildings in the City of Westminster
Grade I listed churches in the City of Westminster
Diocese of London
Gothic Revival church buildings in London
William Butterfield buildings
Fitzrovia
Margaret Street
Anglo-Catholic churches in England receiving AEO